Lise Barbra Skappel Fjeldstad (born 17 June 1939) is a Norwegian actress, and daughter of the conductor and violinist Øivin Fjeldstad. A graduate of  the Norwegian National Academy of Theatre in 1963, she started working at Det Norske Teatret (the Norwegian Theater) immediately afterward. In 1975 she was hired by the National Theatre, where she has acted in roles such as "Blanche Dubois" in Tennessee Williams's A Streetcar Named Desire, and "Agnes" in Henrik Ibsens Brand. She won the Amanda – the main Norwegian film award – for best actress for her role in Dødsdansen in 1991. She has two children with her partner, actor Per Sunderland. She is married to Gordon Braddy.

In 1982 at the 18th Guldbagge Awards she shared the award Best Actress with Sunniva Lindekleiv and Rønnaug Alten for their roles in Little Ida.

In 1993 she was made a Knight, First Class, of the Royal Norwegian Order of St. Olav. She was awarded the Ibsen Centennial Commemoration Award and the Herman Wildenvey Poetry Award in 2006.

Select filmography

References

External links

Biography from Nationaltheateret
List of roles at Nationaltheateret
Interview with Dagbladet

1939 births
Living people
Norwegian film actresses
Norwegian stage actresses
Norwegian television actresses
Oslo National Academy of the Arts alumni
Members of the Norwegian Academy
Best Actress Guldbagge Award winners
Losen Records artists